The International Indigenous Peoples Forum on Climate Change (IIFPCC) is the representative body of indigenous peoples participating in the United Nations Framework Convention on Climate Change (UNFCCC).

Indigenous peoples began engaging with the UNFCCC in 2000,  during a Subsidiary Bodies meetings in Lyon, France on September 8, 2000.  NGOs with UNFCCC observer status nominate participants for sessions of UNFCCC bodies. Capacity building for indigenous peoples to engage with United Nations processes and natural resource management, including promoting traditional knowledge, has supported increasing participation.

Representatives said IIFPCC proposals were mostly ignored at the 2010 United Nations Climate Change Conference that resulted in the Cancún Agreement, in which the need for safeguards for local communities in REDD+ was documented in Annex 1.

Indigenous representatives developed the Oaxaca Action Plan of Indigenous Peoples: From Cancún to Durban and Beyond, a plan for indigenous peoples’ advocacy and lobbying from COP17 through to the World Conference on Indigenous Peoples at UN Headquarters in 2014. The plan aimed to address the lack of implementation of elements of the Cancún Agreement about indigenous peoples’ human rights and their participation in making climate change policies.

The IIFPCC has asked the SBSTA for more effective participation of indigenous peoples and respect for indigenous traditional knowledge in REDD+ monitoring systems. It has articulated links between climate change mitigation and adaptation projects and human rights. It has called for the Green Climate Fund to be more transparent and for greater financial support of indigenous peoples' natural resource management, monitoring and participation in governance.

A new global UNFCC initiative is underway to reduce greenhouse gas emissions released during deforestation, due to a concern that current regulations restrict the ability of native people to regulate the forests that are on their own land. The initiative is called Reducing Emissions from Deforestation and Degradation in Developing Countries. The UNFCC hopes that this initiative may lead to billions of dollars of annual payment for carbon emissions avoided by conservation efforts.

References

International climate change organizations
Indigenous peoples and the environment